The following is a list of villages in Khmelnytskyi Oblast in Ukraine, categorised by Raion.

Kamianets-Podilskyi Raion (Кам'янець-Подільський район)

Khmelnytskyi Raion (Хмельницький район)

Shepetivka Raion (Шепетівський район) 

Khmelnytskyi